AFP is an Australian factual television show that looks at the everyday workings of the Australian Federal Police. It follows AFP investigations and operations in people smuggling, counter terrorism, bomb disposal, international drug syndicates, child sex exploitation and disaster victim identification.

All staff and crew who have worked on the show have been given top secret security clearance.

In 2013, the show was transmitted in the UK on Quest under the title Australia's Toughest Cops.

Episodes

Season 1 (2011)

Season 2 (2012)

Home media

DVD

References

External links
 http://www.afp.gov.au/
 Official website

Nine Network original programming
Australian factual television series
2011 Australian television series debuts
2011 Australian television series endings
Documentary television series about policing